Long Live the Lady! is a 1987 Italian coming-of-age drama film  written and directed by Ermanno Olmi.

The film was entered into the main competition at the 44th edition of the Venice Film Festival, where it got the Silver Lion and the FIPRESCI Prize.

Plot

Cast 
 
     Marco Esposito as  Libenzio
     Simona Brandalise as  Corinna
     Stefania Busarello as  Anna
     Simone Dalla Rosa as  Mao
     Lorenzo Paolini as  Ciccio
     Tarcisio Tosi as  PG (Pigi)
     Marisa Abbate as  La 'Signorina'

References

External links

1987 drama films
1987 films
Films directed by Ermanno Olmi
Italian drama films
1980s Italian-language films
1980s Italian films